Clare E. Rojas (born 1976), also known by stage name Peggy Honeywell, is an American multidisciplinary artist. She is part of the Mission School. Rojas is "known for creating powerful folk-art-inspired tableaus that tackle traditional gender roles." She works in a variety of media, including painting, installations, video, street art, and children's books. Rojas is lives in the San Francisco Bay Area.

Early life and education 
Clare Rojas was born in 1976 in Columbus, Ohio. She is of half-Peruvian descent. As a teenager, Rojas visited a nursing home, where she would make portraits in pastel and oil, while she listened to the interesting stories of her subjects.

She received a BFA degree in Printmaking from the Rhode Island School of Design (RISD); and a MFA degree from the School of the Art Institute of Chicago. At RISD, she studied printmaking, which informed her use of color, layering and sizing. In her search for non toxic paint, she discovered gouache, which she used to paint like a printmaker.

Career 
Rojas work is inspired by folk art. She loves quilts and loves to tell stories, which is reflected in her work.

In her more recent work, Rojas has moved from figurative paintings into pure geometric abstraction. Inspired by Native American textiles, Quaker Art, and Byzantine mosaics, Rojas creates narratives depicting interactions between humans and animals, focusing on history’s journey to find peace. She brings multiple artistic influences together in her textiles by incorporating abstract geometry found in quilts and architecture. Rojas is known for adding elements of female sexuality into her artwork. She does this to give credit to women and recognize their natural strengths.

Peggy Honeywell 
Rojas also plays guitar and banjo under the stage name Peggy Honeywell. She has released three albums: Honey For Dinner (2001), Faint Humms (2005), and Green Mountain (2006).

Personal life 
Rojas married fellow artist Barry McGee in 2005. She adopted his daughter, Asha (Sanskrit for hope), from his previous marriage to Margaret Kilgallen.

Selected solo exhibitions
SOCO Gallery, Charlotte, NC 2019
Egret, Kavi Gupta, Chicago, IL, 2018                        
SOCO Gallery, Charlotte, NC 2016
Alice Gallery, Brussels, Belgium 2016
Gallery Paule Anglim, San Francisco, CA, 2014
San Francisco Museum of Modern Art, Artists Gallery, San Francisco, CA, 2010, "Male Preserve"
Museo de Arte Contemporáneo de Castilla y León, Leon, Spain, 2007
The Rose Art Museum, Waltham MA, 2006
Knoxville Museum of Art, Knoxville, TN, 2005
Deitch Projects, New York, NY, 2004
Museum of Contemporary Art, Chicago, IL, 2002

Public art
 SFO, International Terminal, Gate G Level 3  - Blue Deer 2006-2007, Oil and Pigmented Ink with Gesso Ground on Wood Panels
 982 Market Street, San Francisco, the side of the Warfield Theater - Mural 2014, commissioned by The Luggage Store Gallery and funded by Walter and Elise Haas Fund/Creative Work Fund.

Awards

Project Space Residency, 2003
Tournesol Award, Headlands Center for the Arts, 2003
Artadia Award, 2005
Eureka Fellowship Award, 2005–2007
Walter and Elise Haas Fund, 2013–2014
Ox-Bow School of Art, Artist-in-Residence, 2016

Albums
Clare Rojas performs under the stage name Peggy Honeywell. She has released three albums:

 Honey for Dinner (2001)
 Faint Humms (2005)
 Green Mountain (2006)

References

Further reading 

Artists from Ohio
1976 births
Living people
Rhode Island School of Design alumni
School of the Art Institute of Chicago alumni
Artists from San Francisco
American people of Peruvian descent